Pray, Obey, Kill is a Swedish-American co-produced documentary miniseries revolving around the Knutby murder and the investigation conducted by journalists Anton Berg and Martin Johnson. It consists of 6-episodes and premiered on HBO Europe on April 4, 2021, and in the United States on HBO on April 12, 2021.

Plot
The series follows Anton Berg and Martin Johnson, who conduct an investigation into the Knutby murder in January 2004, which took place in a pentecostalist church congregation cult, when the wife of a pastor is murdered, and a neighbor across the street is injured. The case gains worldwide attention when the assailant claims she received text messages from God, asking her to commit the crime.

Episodes

Production
In January 2021, it was announced HBO Europe and HBO Documentary Films had co-produced a six-episode documentary series revolving around the Knutby murder with Henrik Georgsson set to direct.

References

External links
 
 

2020s American documentary television series
2021 American television series debuts
2020s Swedish television series
HBO Europe original programming
Television shows set in Sweden
Swedish-language television shows
HBO original programming
HBO documentary films
True crime television series
Television series about cults
Television series by Home Box Office
Television series by Warner Bros. Television Studios